Red urine may refer to:

Beeturia, betacyanin-colored urine
Blood-colored urine, including:
Hematuria, the presence of red blood cells (erythrocytes) in the urine
Hemoglobinuria, excess hemoglobin filtered by the kidneys into the urine